Bernstein's theorem is an inequality relating the maximum modulus of a complex polynomial function on the unit disk with the maximum modulus of its derivative on the unit disk. It was proven by Sergei Bernstein while he was working on approximation theory.

Statement 
Let  denote the maximum modulus of an arbitrary
Then for every polynomial  of degree  we have

 .

The inequality is best possible with equality holding if and only if

 .

Proof 

By Rouché's theorem,  with  has all
By virtue of the Gauss–Lucas theorem,

For an arbitrary polynomial  of degree , we obtain Bernstein's Theorem by applying the above result to the polynomials , where  is an arbitrary constant exceeding .

Bernstein's inequality
In mathematical analysis, Bernstein's inequality states that on the complex plane, within the disk of radius 1, the degree of a polynomial times the maximum value of a polynomial is an upper bound for the similar maximum of its derivative. Taking the k-th derivative of the theorem,

Similar results 
This was proved by Peter Lax.

See also
 Markov brothers' inequality
 Remez inequality

References

Further reading
 
 
 

Approximation theory
Theorems about polynomials